Kvam Church is a parish church of the Church of Norway in Steinkjer municipality in Trøndelag county, Norway. It is located in the village of Kvam, along the lake Snåsavatnet. It is the church for the Kvam parish which is part of the Stiklestad prosti (deanery) in the Diocese of Nidaros. The white, wooden church was built in a long church style in 1878 using plans drawn up by the architect Rasmus M. Overrein.

History
The earliest existing historical records of the church date back to the year 1533, but the church was not new that year. There is a crucifix in the church that has been dated to the year 1200, leading archeologists to surmise that the church was founded around that time. Historically, the church name was spelled .

An inspection of the very old church in 1664 noted that the building was about ready to collapse because the structure was rotting. Soon afterwards, the old church was torn down and a new log church was built on the same site in 1671. The new church was consecrated on 12 August 1671 by the Bishop Erik Bredal.

By the 1870s, the parish wanted a new church and there was a great dispute as to where to build it. After much debate, a royal resolution from 27 January 1877 ordered that the new church was to be built by the lake in 1878. The church was consecrated on 13 November 1878 by Bishop Andreas Grimelund. The old church was torn down aftert the new one was completed.

See also
List of churches in Nidaros

References

Steinkjer
Churches in Trøndelag
Long churches in Norway
Wooden churches in Norway
19th-century Church of Norway church buildings
Churches completed in 1878
13th-century establishments in Norway